Widowed Persons Service is an American organization designed to provide support for widows and widowers by people who have themselves lost a spouse.

AARP established Widowed Persons Service in 1973. As of 1998, WPS had a network of around 300 chapters.

References 

Organizations established in 1973
1973 establishments in the United States
Widowhood in the United States